Uganda National Academy of Sciences is a nonprofit, scientific organization in Uganda, that brings together scientists from the behavioral, biological, physical and social sciences. These scientists work together to promote excellence in sciences by "offering independent, evidence-based advice for the prosperity of Uganda", according to the academy's brochure.

Location
The headquarters of Uganda National Academy of Science are at A4 Lincoln House, Makerere University, in Kampala, Uganda's capital city. The coordinates of the academy headquarters are 0°19'56.0"N, 32°34'11.5"E (Latitude:0.332222; Longitude:32.569861).

Overview
The Uganda National Academy of Science is an autonomous organization of diverse leaders in various fields of science, who aspire to use merit-based science to inform Uganda's development.

History
The academy was founded on 20 October 2000. As of 2018, the organisation had over 120 registered members, of whom 65 were Fellows of the academy.

Fellows
The following are some of the Fellows of the Uganda National Academy of Science:
 James Ntambi: professor of biochemistry and of nutritional sciences, at the University of Wisconsin, Madison
 Harriet Mayanja-Kizza: professor of medicine and dean of Makerere University School of Medicine.
 Emmanuel Tumusiime-Mutebile: professor of economics, Makerere University. Chancellor of the International University of East Africa. Governor of the Bank of Uganda.
 Christine Dranzoa: professor of zoology and vice chancellor of Muni University.
 David Serwadda: professor of medicine and public health, at Makerere University College of Health Sciences. Former dean of the School of Public Health at Makerere University.
 Noble Ephraim Banadda: professor and chair of the Department of Agricultural and BioSystems Engineering at Makerere University. Youngest person to achieve rank of full professor in the history of the university, at age of 37 years.
 Peter Ndimbirwe Mugyenyi: professor and chancellor of Mbarara University of Science and Technology. Executive Director of the Joint Clinical Research Centre.
 Zerubabel Nyiira: entomologist and bio-ecologist. Former State Minister of Agriculture of Uganda. Also Former State Minister of Fisheries of Uganda. Member of Parliament for Buruuli County, Masindi District.
 Jack Pen-Mogi Nyeko: professor of veterinary medicine and immediate past vice chancellor of Gulu University. 
 Maud Kamatenesi Mugisha: professor and vice chancellor of Bishop Stuart University.
 Nelson Sewankambo: professor of medicine and immediate past Principal of Makerere University College of Health Sciences. President of the Uganda National Academy of Sciences.
 Mary Okwakol: professor of zoology and vice chancellor of Busitema University.
 John Ssebuwufu: professor of chemistry and chancellor, University of Kisubi.
 Gilbert Bukenya: professor of public health and former vice president of the Republic of Uganda.
 Apollo Nsibambi: professor of economics and social science at Makerere University. Former prime minister of Uganda.
 Lillian Tibatemwa-Ekirikubinza: justice of the Supreme Court of Uganda. Former professor of Law and former deputy vice-chancellor responsible for academic affairs at Makerere University.
 Paul Waako: physician, clinical pharmacologist, academic and academic administrator. Vice chancellor of Busitema University, since 1 May 2019.

Other considerations
The Uganda National Academy of Science has collaborations with the Network of African Science Academies, Network of Science Academies in Islamic Countries, the US National Academies, InterAcademy Partnership, and The World Academy of Sciences.

See also
National Academy of Sciences

References

External links
Website of Uganda National Academy of Sciences

Scientific organisations based in Uganda
Members of the International Council for Science
Scientific organizations established in 2000
2000 establishments in Uganda
National academies of sciences
Fellows of Uganda National Academy of Sciences